is a Japanese actress, voice actress, singer, and model affiliated with Amuse. She is a former member of Sakura Gakuin and is best known for voicing Junna Hoshimi in Revue Starlight, Leah Kazuno in Love Live! Sunshine!!, Noa Fukushima in D4DJ, and Mizuki Akiyama in Hatsune Miku: Colorful Stage!.

Biography
Hinata Satō was born on 23 December 1998 in Yamagata Prefecture and two years later moved to Niigata Prefecture where she lived until third grade. Admiring Ayami Mutō, she started performing arts activities around kindergarten.

She successfully auditioned for the idol unit Sakura Gakuin, and she started activities for the unit in April 2010. She was appointed "mood chair" at the unit's 2013 Transference Ceremony held on 5 May. She graduated from the unit in March 2014.

She voiced Rin Karasawa, a major character in the anime Kutsudaru., which began on 2 April 2014. She formed the unit Maboroshi Love with three other cast members (Marina Horiuchi, Miki Kanai, and Yuika Shima), and they released the single "Merry Go World" for the anime on 19 November of the same year, which charted at #90 in the Oricon singles chart.

She performed as Cynthia in The Goodbye Girl at Tokyo International Forum Hall C in August 2015. She also portrayed Alice in Stray Sheep Paradise and its sequel.

She voiced Leah Kazuno in Love Live! Sunshine!!, and she was performed in the Saint Snow concert held at Hakodate Arena in April 2018 with her Saint Snow bandmate Asami Tano. She also voices Junna Hoshimi in Revue Starlight. She has also appeared in other Starlight media, including the Shōjo Konto All-Starlight web series, the Re Live video game, the stage adaptation, and the Radio Starlight radio show.

Filmography

Live-action 
2010
Hagane no Onna Season 1, episodes 1-7
2011
Hagane no Onna Season 2, episodes 1, 2, 6, and 9
2016
Shin Yameken no Onna season 2
2017
Byplayers, episode 5
Saki ni umareta dake no Boku, episode 7
2018
Boys Over Flower Season 2, episode 1

Anime
KutsuDaru., Rin Karasawa
Love Live! Sunshine!!, Leah Kazuno
Revue Starlight, Junna Hoshimi
D4DJ First Mix, Noa Fukushima
D4DJ Petit Mix, Noa Fukushima
My Stepmom's Daughter Is My Ex, Chikuma Tanesato

Film
 Love Live! Sunshine!! The School Idol Movie Over the Rainbow, Leah Kazuno

Web
 Shōjo Konto All-Starlight, 2019, Junna Hoshimi

Radio
 Radio Starlight

Video games
2018
Shōjo Kageki Revue Starlight -Re LIVE-, Junna Hoshimi
 Kōsei Shōjo: Do The Scientists Dream of Girls'Asterism?, Alperg
2019
 Project Sekai Colorful Stage! feat. Hatsune Miku, Mizuki Akiyama

Stage
2015
The Goodbye Girl, Cynthia
2016
Cosmos Gakuen Chorus Club, Asuka Sakurai
2017
Revue Starlight the Live, Junna Hoshimi
2018
Stray Sheep Paradise, Alice
2019
Stray Sheep Paradise:em, Alice

Others
2017
Tsūkai TV Sukatto Japan
2019
Media Mix Project "D4DJ", Noa Fukushima

References

External links
 Profile at Amuse
 
 

1998 births
Living people
Amuse Inc. talents
Anime singers
Japanese women pop singers
Japanese idols
Japanese television actresses
Japanese video game actresses
Japanese voice actresses
Musicians from Niigata Prefecture
Musicians from Yamagata Prefecture
Saint Snow members
Sakura Gakuin members
Starlight 99-gumi members
Voice actresses from Niigata Prefecture
Voice actresses from Yamagata Prefecture
21st-century Japanese actresses
21st-century Japanese women singers
21st-century Japanese singers